Nora O'Mahoney (1912–1989) was an Irish actress and lay missionary, known for Molly Malloy in Darby O'Gill and the Little People (1959) and as Godmother in Wanderly Wagon (1967–1982).

Early life and career
Born in Dublin in 1912, O'Mahoney started in theatre, and worked extensively in the 1930s and 1940s, including plays such as Drama at Inish (1933), Le Bourgeois Gentilhomme (1941), and The United Brothers (1942). She started her film career with some uncredited appearances in movies such as Captain Boycott (1947) and Daughter of Darkness (1948).

She emigrated to America in the early 1950s, where she continued to work in theatre, and was in a number a television episodes in anthology shows such as The 20th Century-Fox Hour (1955), Lux Video Theatre (1955), Front Row Center (1956), Climax! (1956), and Alfred Hitchcock Presents (1957). In 1959 she played a character named Molly Malloy in two productions, Darby O'Gill and the Little People (1959) and in Walt Disney's Wonderful World of Color (1959).

Soon after these two roles she gave up acting for a time, working as a lay missionary in Rhodesia, where she was Bishop Lamont's secretary for several years until she became ill, and was invalided home to Ireland.

She returned to acting in Ireland, first doing voice work on shows like Newsbeat (1964–71), and then won the role of Godmother in Wanderly Wagon (1967–1982). Her last television role was as Mrs. Hodnott in an episode of The Irish R.M..

Death
She died in December 1989 in Dublin, Ireland, aged 77.

Filmography

Television

 The Irish R.M. – (1984) – Mrs. Hodnott
 Wanderly Wagon – (1967–1982) – Godmother
 The Detectives – (1960) – Irene
 The Ann Sothern Show – (1959) – Mrs. Riley / Brianie
 Walt Disney's Wonderful World of Color – (1959) – Molly Malloy
 The Third Man (TV series) – (1959) – The Maid
 Playhouse 90 – (1958) – Abbey
 The Californians – (1958) – Mrs. Hayes / Molly McDonald
  Little Moon of Alban – (1958) – Shelagh Mangan
 Alfred Hitchcock Presents – (1958) – Flower Lady
 General Electric Theater – (1956)
 Climax! – (1956) 
 The Millionaire (TV series) – (1956) – Mother Superior
 Front Row Center – (1956) – Aggie
 Lux Video Theatre – (1955) – Martha
 The 20th Century-Fox Hour – (1955) – Ellen Bridges

Film

 Holiday for Lovers – (1959) – Mrs. Murphy
 Darby O'Gill and the Little People – (1959) – Molly Malloy
 The Remarkable Mr. Pennypacker – (1959) – Mrs. McNair (uncredited)
 Rally 'Round the Flag, Boys! – (1958) – Town Meeting Speaker (uncredited)
 Daughter of Darkness – (1948) – Miss Hegarty (uncredited)
 Captain Boycott – (1947) – Irish Villager (uncredited)

References

External links
 
 
 IrishPlayography: Nora O'Mahoney
 The Hitchcock Zone: Nora O'Mahoney
 Images of Nora O'Mahoney in the Museum of the City of New York
 Clip of Wanderly Wagon

1912 births
1989 deaths
Actresses from Dublin (city)
20th-century Irish actresses
Irish emigrants to the United States
Irish film actresses
Irish television actresses